Tui Samoa is an American rugby league footballer who plays for the Junee Diesels in the Group 9 Rugby League competition. He primarily plays as a hooker, but can play as a lock and halfback. He is a United States International.

Playing career
He played for American Samoa in the 2004 Pacific Cup on 20 Oct 2004 in Auckland.

Samoa has played for the United States in both the 2013 and 2017 Rugby League World Cup.

He has previously played for the Redcliffe Dolphins in the Intrust Super Cup.

References

External links
http://www.redcliffedolphins.com.au/index.php?id=4588
2017 RLWC profile

1983 births
Living people
American rugby league players
American Samoa national rugby league team players
Redcliffe Dolphins players
Rugby league hookers
United States national rugby league team players